Susannah V. Aldrich (November 14, 1828 – November 30, 1905) was a 19th-century American author and hymnwriter from Massachusetts. She contributed prose and poetry to a number of papers and magazines. Aldrich died in 1905.

Biography
Susannah (or Susanna) Valentine Aldrich was born in Hopkinton, Massachusetts, November 14, 1828. She was the only child of Willard and Lucy (Morse) Aldrich. As a child, she showed fondness for writing her thoughts. In her schooldays, she found it far easier to write compositions than to commit lessons to memory, and she was generally permitted to choose her own subjects for the regular "composition day" in school. Her studies were interrupted by a severe illness which lasted for several years.

The Rev. John Calvin Webster, her pastor, also one of the directors of the academy which Aldrich attended, was struck with the merit and quality of her compositions, and selected some of them to offer to a magazine for publication. These were accepted. For many years, Aldrich contributed prose and poetry to a number of papers and magazines. She was a victim to insomnia, and she always kept paper and pencil within reach in order to jot down her ideas during periods of wakefulness. After her health became impaired, she confined her literary work to various occasions. 

From 1879, she made her home in the Roxbury District of Boston. 
She died in Boston, November 30, 1905 and is buried at Mount Auburn Cemetery in Hopkinton.

Selected works

Hymns
 Original hymn, between 1850-1865
Anniversary Hymn
At the Mercy Seat
Buried with Thee
Come and Help Us
Dedication of a Church
Drawing Nearer
Easter Hymn
Faith
Give Me That Heart of Flesh
He Is Risen
He Leadeth
How Fair upon the Mountains
In the Battle
Light of the World
Messenger, The
Missionary Hymn
I may hear His voice at morning

References

Bibliography

External links
 
 

1828 births
1905 deaths
19th-century American writers
19th-century American women writers
19th-century American women musicians
Writers from Massachusetts
American Protestant hymnwriters
People from Hopkinton, Massachusetts
American women hymnwriters
American women non-fiction writers
Wikipedia articles incorporating text from A Woman of the Century